The University of the Mediterranean Aix-Marseille II was a French university in the Academy of Aix and Marseille. Historically, it was part of the University of Aix-Marseille based across the communes of Aix-en-Provence and Marseille in southern France. It had 24,000 students.
On 1 January 2012 it merged with the University of Provence and Paul Cézanne University to become Aix-Marseille University, the youngest, but also the largest in terms of students, budgets and staff in France.

Academic programs

The university is particularly strong in sciences with faculties for science (Faculté des Sciences de Luminy), sport sciences (Faculté des Sciences du Sport), engineering (École supérieure d'ingénieurs de Luminy) and economic science and management (Faculté des Sciences Économiques et de Gestion). The medical school comprises the faculties of Medicine, Pharmacy and Dentistry.

In addition, there are a number of institutes:
Institut de Mécanique de Marseille (Institute of mechanics at Marseille)
École de Journalisme et de Communication (School of Journalism and Communications)
Institut Universitaire de Technologie (University Institute for technology)
Institut Régional du Travail (Regional institute for work)
Centre d'océanologie de Marseille (Oceanography center of Marseille)
Ecole Universitaire de Maïeutique Marseille Méditerranée

History
The Université d'Aix-en-Provence was initially created in 1409 by Louis II de Provence.
In 1791, like every university in France, it was dissolved and the faculties were dispersed between the two cities of Aix-en-Provence and Marseille and became autonomous. On 21 April 1881 by decree of the conseil municipal (city council) the medical school was opened at the palais du Pharo by the Vieux Port, Marseille. In 1969, two universities were established between Aix-en-Provence and Marseille. In 1973, the third was created (Université d'Aix-Marseille III). In 1994, the Université d'Aix-Marseille II took the name of Université de la Méditerranée.

Alumni
 Xavier Laurent
 Christine Beeton

Notes and references

See also
 University of Aix-Marseille
 List of public universities in France by academy

External links
  Official site

 
Aix-Marseille University
Defunct universities and colleges in France
Educational institutions established in 1969
Educational institutions disestablished in 2012
University of the Mediterranean
University of the Mediterranean
1969 establishments in France
2012 disestablishments in France